Hersch Tower is a historic Art Deco building in midtown Elizabeth, New Jersey.

The Newark architect, Nathan Myers (who had designed Temple B'Nai Abraham on Clinton Avenue in that city) and Princeton-trained Joseph Shanley designed and planned the building. It originally had self-contained vacuum system, where each unit had a wall receptacle to which one attached a vacuum hose and proceeded without additional machinery. The building also sported a fire escape system—only two of which existed in the US—in which an internal slide would pass tenants from any floor to the street swiftly in case of an emergency.

During the 1970s the building was partially renovated including replacement of the elevators and silver leaf in the lobby. It went into foreclosure and was purchased in 1990 by the Brooklyn-based Wydra brothers.

Hersch Tower is contributing property to the Mid-Town Historic District which also includes the Elizabeth Public Library and the Union County Courthouse. and other early high-rises, the Winfield Scott Tower and the Afbender Building.

In April 2018, the building received approval from the City of Elizabeth Planning Board to convert the 2nd through 11th Floors to residential dwelling units. Retail and commercial uses will occupy the ground floor and a rooftop lounge and deck is proposed on the 12th floor. The building modifications were designed by Graviano & Gillis Architects & Planners, LLC.

See also

List of tallest buildings in Elizabeth
List of tallest buildings in New Jersey

References 

Buildings and structures in Elizabeth, New Jersey
Office buildings completed in 1931
Art Deco architecture in New Jersey
Tourist attractions in Union County, New Jersey
National Register of Historic Places in Union County, New Jersey
Office buildings in New Jersey
New Jersey Register of Historic Places
Historic district contributing properties in New Jersey